The 1937 Nova Scotia general election was held on 20 June 1937 to elect members of the 41st House of Assembly of the Province of Nova Scotia, Canada. It was won by the Liberal Party.

Results

Results by party

Retiring incumbents
Liberal
Clarence W. Anderson, Guysborough
George R. Deveau, Richmond
Guy Murray Logan, Halifax Centre

Progressive Conservative
Seth M. Bartling, Queens
William A. Flemming, Colchester
Weldon W. Patton, Cape Breton West

Nominated candidates
Legend
bold denotes party leader
† denotes an incumbent who is not running for re-election or was defeated in nomination contest

Valley

|-
|bgcolor=whitesmoke|Annapolis
||
|John D. McKenzie4,97757.35%
|
|James Eugene Morse3,70242.65%
|
|
||
|John D. McKenzie
|-
|bgcolor=whitesmoke|Digby
||
|Joseph William Comeau5,17958.19%
|
|Edward Brenett Pugh3,72141.81%
|
|
||
|Joseph William Comeau
|-
|bgcolor=whitesmoke|Hants
||
|Alexander Stirling MacMillan5,59054.96%
|
|Leonard W. Fraser4,58145.04%
|
|
||
|Alexander Stirling MacMillan
|-
|bgcolor=whitesmoke|Kings
||
|John Alexander McDonald7,47032.34%
|
|George Nowlan5,79025.07%
|
|
||
|John Alexander McDonald
|}

South Shore

|-
|rowspan=2 bgcolor=whitesmoke|Lunenburg
||
|Frank R. Davis8,07328.28%
|
|Reginald E. Hyson6,26821.95%
|
|
||
|Frank R. Davis
|-
||
|Gordon E. Romkey7,79627.31%
|
|Vernon L. Pearson6,41422.47%
|
|
||
|Gordon E. Romkey
|-
|bgcolor=whitesmoke|Queens
|
|J. Ross Byrne2,71548.09%
||
|John J. Cameron2,93151.91%
|
|
||
|Seth M. Bartling†
|-
|bgcolor=whitesmoke|Shelburne
||
|Henry R. L. Bill3,21558.41%
|
|Norman Emmons Smith2,28941.59%
|
|
||
|Henry R. L. Bill
|-
|bgcolor=whitesmoke|Yarmouth 
||
|Lindsay C. Gardner5,56660.11%
|
|Peter Lorimer Judge3,69439.89%
|
|
||
|Lindsay C. Gardner
|}

Fundy-Northeast

|-
|rowspan=2 bgcolor=whitesmoke|Colchester
|
|Harry B. Havey5,79123.45%
||
|Frederick Murray Blois6,69827.13%
|
|
||
|William A. Flemming†
|-
|
|Edward G. McColough5,61422.74%
||
|George Y. Thomas6,58726.68%
|
|
||
|George Y. Thomas
|-
|rowspan=2 bgcolor=whitesmoke|Cumberland
|
|John S. Smiley8,04722.58%
||
|Archie B. Smith9,27226.02%
|
|
||
|John S. Smiley
|-
|
|Archibald J. Mason8,02422.52%
||
|Percy Chapman Black10,28928.88%
|
|
||
|Percy Chapman Black
|}

Halifax/Dartmouth/Eastern Shore

|-
|bgcolor=whitesmoke|Halifax Centre
||
|William Duff Forrest5,18654.61%
|
|Arthur Wilfred Morton4,31045.39%
|
|
||
|Guy Murray Logan†
|-
|bgcolor=whitesmoke|Halifax East
||
|Geoffrey W. Stevens6,08252.27%
|
|Josiah Frederick Fraser5,55447.73%
|
|
||
|Geoffrey W. Stevens
|-
|bgcolor=whitesmoke|Halifax North
||
|Harold Connolly5,45857.81%
|
|Gerald Patrick Flavin3,98442.19%
|
|
||
|Harold Connolly
|-
|bgcolor=whitesmoke|Halifax South
||
|Angus Lewis Macdonald5,44656.10%
|
|Richard Donahoe4,26243.90%
|
|
||
|Angus Lewis Macdonald
|-
|bgcolor=whitesmoke|Halifax West
||
|George E. Hagen5,03454.00%
|
|Earle C. Phinney4,28846.00%
|
|
||
|George E. Hagen
|}

Central Nova

|-
|bgcolor=whitesmoke|Antigonish 
||
|John L. MacIsaac3,16061.11%
|
|Robert H. Butts2,01138.89%
|
|
||
|John L. MacIsaac
|-
|bgcolor=whitesmoke|Guysborough
||
|Havelock Torrey4,36857.81%
|
|Howard Amos Rice3,18842.19%
|
|
||
|Clarence W. Anderson†
|-
|rowspan=2 bgcolor=whitesmoke|Pictou
||
|Newton G. Munro9,63725.96%
|
|John A. MacGregor8,89023.95%
|
|
||
|Vacant
|-
||
|Josiah H. MacQuarrie10,14927.34%
|
|Rod H. MacLeod8,44122.74%
|
|
||
|Josiah H. MacQuarrie
|}

Cape Breton

|-
|bgcolor=whitesmoke|Cape Breton Centre
||
|Michael Dwyer4,14859.56%
|
|Robert Simpson MacLellan2,81640.44%
|
|
||
|Michael Dwyer
|-
|bgcolor=whitesmoke|Cape Breton East
||
|Lauchlin Daniel Currie4,17240.12%
|
|Roderick Kerr2,83227.23%
|
|William T. Mercer3,39632.65%
||
|Lauchlin Daniel Currie
|-
|bgcolor=whitesmoke|Cape Breton North
||
|George Belcher Murray4,67951.73%
|
|Joseph Macdonald4,36648.27%
|
|
||
|Joseph Macdonald
|-
|bgcolor=whitesmoke|Cape Breton South
||
|George M. Morrison5,87952.00%
|
|Gordon Sidney Harrington5,42748.00%
|
|
||
|Gordon Sidney Harrington
|-
|bgcolor=whitesmoke|Cape Breton West
||
|Malcolm A. Patterson2,88350.80%
|
|Evan MacK. Forbes2,79249.20%
|
|
||
|Weldon W. Patton†
|-
|bgcolor=whitesmoke|Inverness
||
|Moses Elijah McGarry5,83625.27%
|
|Alexander Daniel McInnis4,00217.33%
|
|
||
|Moses Elijah McGarry
|-
|bgcolor=whitesmoke|Richmond
||
|Donald David Boyd2,88853.38%
|
|Benjamin Amedeé LeBlanc2,52246.62%
|
|
||
|George R. Deveau†
|-
|bgcolor=whitesmoke|Victoria
||
|John Malcolm Campbell2,33557.17%
|
|Frederick Walker Baldwin1,74942.83%
|
|
||
|Frederick Walker Baldwin
|}

References

Further reading
 

1937
1937 elections in Canada
1937 in Nova Scotia
June 1937 events